This is the discography of American rapper Lil' Keke from Houston, Texas.

Albums

Studio albums

Other albums

Collaborative albums

Compilations

Official mixtapes
2006: Minor Setback for the Major Comeback (A Gangsta Grillz Extra) (Mixed by DJ Drama)
2006: The Album B4 the Album (3 Disc Set)
2007: Lil`Keke's Greatest Verses (Mixed by DJ LL & Desdem DJ's)
2007: The Cost of Living (with Yung Redd)
2007: Southern Elite (with 50-50 Twin & J-Stew, Mixed by DJ Sedd)
2008: Only the Strong Survive (Mixed by DJ Bigga Rankin)
2008: Seven 13 Hustlaz Vol.1: Da Movement
2008: South Side Still Holding (Mixed by DJ Mac Boo)
2009: Seven 13 Vol.2: Small Thangs 2 a Giant
2009: Universal Ghetto Pass - The Mixtape (Mixed by DJ Michael "5000" Watts)
2010: Addicted 2 Fame
2010: The Trilogy (Seven 13 Vol.3)
2010: Seven 13 Vol.4
2010: Texas Mafia (with Lil' Flip & Judge Dredd)
2011: Peepin in my Window 2K11: All Freestyles
2011: C.O.D. - Cash On Delivery (Seven 13 Vol.5)
2011: Fish Grease Mixtape
2012: Da Leak
2012: A.B.A. II (Album Before the Album II)
2013: 7.1.3D (Mixed by DJ Drop)
2014: A.B.A. 3 (Album Before the Album 3) (Mixed by DJ Michael 5000 Watts)
2016: 7Thirteen Tribute (Mixed by DJ Young Samm)
2016: A.B.A. IV (Album Before the Album IV)

Singles

As lead artist

As featured artist

Promotional singles

Guest appearances

References

External links 
 Lil' Keke discography at Discogs

Discographies of American artists